August Wilhelm Zumpt (4 December 181522 April 1877 in Berlin) was a German classical scholar, known chiefly in connection with Latin epigraphy. He was a nephew of philologist Karl Gottlob Zumpt.

Born in Königsberg, Zumpt studied at the University of Berlin (1832–36). From 1839 to 1851, he was a professor at Friedrich Werder Gymnasium (Berlin), afterwards working as a professor at Friedrich-Wilhelms-Gymnasium under the direction of Karl Ferdinand Ranke. He travelled extensively during his career; England (1845, 1860), Italy (1851, 1857, 1864), Greece, Egypt, Palestine and Asia Minor (1871–72).

His papers on epigraphy (collected in "Commentationes epigraphicae", 2 vols., 1850, 1854) brought him into conflict with Theodor Mommsen in connexion with the preparation of the Corpus Inscriptionum Latinarum, a scheme for which, drawn up by Mommsen, was approved in 1847.

Works 
 Edition of Rutilius Claudius Namatianus, "De Reditu Suo Libri Duo" (1840).            
 "De Augustalibus et Seviris Augustalibus commentatio epigraphica" (1846).
 "Caesaris Augusti index rerum a se gestarum sive monumentum Ancyranum"  (with Johannes Franck, 1845).
 "Augusti Wilhelmi Zumptii Commentationum epigraphicarum ad antiquitates Romanas pertinentium" (two voumes 1850, 1854).    
 Das Criminalrecht der römischen Republik (two volumes 1865, 1869).
 Editions of Cicero; "Oratio pro L. Murena" (1859) and "Orationes Tres de lege agraria" (1861).
 "De monumento Ancyrano supplendo commantatio" (1869).
 Der Criminalprocess der römischen Republik (1871).

Wilhelm Ihne incorporated materials left by him in the seventh and eighth volumes of his "Römische Geschichte".

References

1815 births
1877 deaths
German classical scholars
Writers from Königsberg
Humboldt University of Berlin alumni
Latin epigraphers